Kroombit Tops is a national park in Central Queensland, Australia. It is between Monto and Calliope. It is two parts. The largest part is within the localities of Tablelands, Valentine Plains, Cania and Boyne Valley, while the smaller part is in the locality of Mount Alma. It is 399 km northwest of Brisbane. Cania Gorge National Park is located approximately 25 km to the south.

In February 1945, an American Liberator Bomber, "Beautiful Betsy", crashed into what is now Kroombit Tops National Park.  The wreckage was discovered on 2 August 1994.

Recreational activities conducted in the park include birdwatching, off-road driving and bushwalking. Camping is permitted.

Fauna
The park provides refuge for the Kroombit tinker frog, which has only been found within the park. However, in the same month, the first froglet  of this species was bred in captivity at Currumbin Wildlife Sanctuary, raising hopes that it may be saved from extinction.

In 2013, a new species of marsupial, the silver-headed antechinus, was described, also only found in the national park.

A small population of brumbies roams the park; they are sometimes mustered to reduce numbers.

Abundant in the park is the Kroombit Tops Assassin Spider (Austrarchaea alani).

Crash site

On 2 August 1994, the wreckage of a United States Army Air Forces Consolidated B-24D Liberator, Beautiful Betsy, was discovered in the park. The aircraft had gone missing in stormy weather on 26 February 1945 while on a "Fat Cat" run from Darwin to Brisbane - transporting men and supplies as part of a regular flight.

See also

 Protected areas of Queensland

References

External links

Kroombit Mud Map at boynevalley.org.au
Kroombit and "Beautiful Betsy"

National parks of Central Queensland
Protected areas established in 1974
1974 establishments in Australia